Datong District may refer to the following locations in mainland China or Taiwan:

Datong District, Daqing (大同区), Heilongjiang
Datong District, Huainan (大通区), Anhui
Datong District, Taipei (大同區), Taiwan

District name disambiguation pages